Brownell–Cornell–Gibbs Farmstead is a historic home and farm located near Buskirk, Rensselaer County, New York. The farmhouse was built between about 1800 and 1825, and consists of a two-story, banked, rectangular frame main block with an attached large two-story woodshed.  It has a one-story, hip roofed addition dated to 1943, and Federal style design elements.  Also on the property are the contributing threshing barn (c. 1800), tool barn / grain house (c. 1830), hen house (1936), garage (1926), and wagon shed (c. 1940).

It was listed on the National Register of Historic Places in 2012.

References

Farms on the National Register of Historic Places in New York (state)
Federal architecture in New York (state)
Houses completed in 1825
Buildings and structures in Rensselaer County, New York
National Register of Historic Places in Rensselaer County, New York